Ozhiginskaya is a rural locality (a village) in Mishutinskoye Rural Settlement, Vozhegodsky District, Vologda Oblast, Russia. The population was 19 as of 2002.

Geography 
Ozhiginskaya is located 65 km east of Vozhega (the district's administrative centre) by road. Mishutinskaya is the nearest rural locality.

References 

Rural localities in Vozhegodsky District